The Seagull Lake is sub-coastal saline lake fed by a marine spring located in the locality of Yanerbie on the western side of the Eyre Peninsula in South Australia within the boundaries of the Sceale Bay Conservation Park.

Description
The  sub-coastal lake was reported in 2010 as being "dominated by Zostera and Ruppia marine seagrasses".  There are grassed sand-dunes on the west between the lake and the bay. On the east the lake is bordered by about a kilometre of whipstick mallee and paperbarks, before a series of ephemeral saline wetlands.  The surrounds retain much native vegetation, especially samphire and halophytic shrubland.  The threatened Beaded Samphire and West Coast Mintbush are found at the lake.  Although some parts are permanently wet, much of the lake bed dries up during droughts.

Protected area status

Statutory
Seagull Lake is within the boundaries of the Sceale Bay Conservation Park.

Non-statutory arrangements
Seagull Lake is within the boundaries of an Important Bird Area (IBA) known as the Seagull Lake Important Bird Area.  The IBA was identified by BirdLife International because it regularly supports a breeding colony of fairy terns.  Potential threats to the colony are from disturbance by people, vehicles and dogs, water abstraction in the catchment, and fox predation.  Other birds recorded using the lake are banded stilts, red-necked avocets, red-necked stints, red-capped plovers, sharp-tailed sandpipers and hooded plovers.

See also

 List of lakes of South Australia

References

Eyre Peninsula
Saline lakes of South Australia